The Richmond Staples Mill Road Amtrak station is located in unincorporated Henrico County, about 5 miles (8 km) north of downtown Richmond. The station was designed by David Volkert and Associates, and was built in 1975 as a replacement for Main Street Station in downtown Richmond, which had been heavily damaged by flooding from Hurricane Agnes. At its opening, it also inherited trains that had called at Richmond's other former union station, Broad Street Station, with a bus connection to the short-lived Richmond–Ellerson Street Station. Although limited Amtrak service returned to Main Street Station in December 2003, Staples Mill Road remains the primary rail station for the Richmond area, and all Richmond trains make a stop there. Richmond Main Street Station only sees trains that terminate there or at Newport News, since the other trains bypass downtown Richmond to the west.

The station has an indoor waiting room with restrooms, a snack bar, and a ticket window.

Nearby modes of transportation
There are pedestrian sidewalks along Staples Mill Road, but the area surrounding the train station is a suburban sprawl area built in the 1970s. A designated line-up area for taxicabs is onsite next to the train station parking lot. GRTC bus service is available (via the Henrico County Government Center Shuttle 18). There are a few rental car agencies within a couple of miles of the station, as are Greyhound and other intercity bus services. The payment for parking is through a set of self-service ticketing kiosks, at less than $10/day.  The station has 589 spots.

Henrico County completed a multi-mode transportation upgrade in 2018. Staples Mill Road Station became the site of a new express bus station and the station building and platforms were improved. The parking lots were expanded and new taxi/ride-sharing zones were established.

Train service
As of July 2022, the station is served by nine routes for a total of 18 trains daily, all of which continue north to Washington Union Station and New York Pennsylvania Station (some continuing as far north as Boston's South Station):
 Northeast Regional - six daily routes, two of which terminate in Newport News, three of which terminate in Norfolk, and one of which terminates at Richmond Main Street Station
 Silver Meteor and Silver Star - two daily routes continuing south to Miami, Florida.
 Carolinian - one daily route continuing southwest to Charlotte, North Carolina
 Palmetto - one daily train continuing south to Savannah, Georgia

As of 2018, Staples Mill Road is the busiest Amtrak station in Virginia, and the busiest in the Southeast, with 373,800 boardings and detrainings yearly. This is mainly due to the large number of passengers traveling to and from Washington and points north.

Future plans
The Amtrak schedule at Staples Mill may increase to 30 trains per day, 15 in each direction, by 2030.

The May 2019 federal and state approved DC to Richmond plan for expanded rail service between Washington and the Richmond area would result in more trains per day, and the following Staples Mill Station improvements:
 Two new level-boarding platforms (the current platforms are low-level)
 Pedestrian overpass or underpass
 Replace the station building
All Richmond trains would stop at both Staples Mill and Main Street, after extensive track improvements. A new bridge would be built over the James River, and a rail yard constructed in South Richmond. The 2019 plan is coordinated with updates to the Southeast High Speed Rail Corridor plan.

See also
Broad Street Station (Richmond)

References

External links

Richmond Staples Mill Road Amtrak Station – USA Rail Guide (TrainWeb)

Amtrak stations in Virginia
Amtrak Thruway Motorcoach stations in Virginia
Transportation in Richmond, Virginia
Railway stations in the United States opened in 1975
GRTC Pulse stations
2018 establishments in Virginia
Bus stations in Virginia
Proposed public transportation in Virginia
1975 establishments in Virginia
Transport infrastructure completed in 2018